Hastings is a city in the U.S. state of Michigan, the county seat of Barry County as well as the county's only city.  The population was 7,514 at the 2020 census. The city borders Hastings Charter Township on the north, east, and south, and Rutland Charter Township on the west.

History
In 1836 three entrepreneurs named Dibble, Kingsbury and Kendall bought  along the Thornapple River from Detroit banker Eurotas P. Hastings.  The three platted the area into lots, and soon a small community arose. In 1843, the  state legislature designated Hastings as the County Seat of Barry County.  The first paper, the Barry County Pioneer, began publishing in 1851, and a second paper, the Republican Banner, began in 1856. The latter publication, a weekly paper published on Thursdays, continues to be published as the Hastings Banner.

Hastings was incorporated as a village in 1855, with a population of around 300, and on March 11, 1871, Hastings officially became a city.  The Barry County Courthouse, which is still in use today, was built in 1893.  The city grew slowly, reaching 6,500 people in 1960 and remaining nearly flat through 1990.

Geography
The Thornapple River passes through the city from east to west.

Climate
The Köppen Climate Classification subtype for this climate is "Dfb" (Warm Summer Continental Climate).

Demographics

2010 census
As of the census of 2010, there were 7,350 people, 2,910 households, and 1,849 families living in the city. The racial makeup of the city was 96.9% White, 0.5% African American, 0.6% Native American, 0.3% Asian, 0.5% from other races, and 1.2% from two or more races. Hispanic or Latino of any race were 2.7% of the population.

There were 2,910 households, of which 34.9% had children under the age of 18 living with them, 44.2% were married couples living together, 14.4% had a female householder with no husband present, 5.0% had a male householder with no wife present, and 36.5% were non-families. 31.0% of all households were made up of individuals, and 14.9% had someone living alone who was 65 years of age or older. The average household size was 2.47 and the average family size was 3.07.

The median age in the city was 36.2 years. 26.6% of residents were under the age of 18; 9% were between the ages of 18 and 24; 24.7% were from 25 to 44; 24.1% were from 45 to 64; and 15.4% were 65 years of age or older. The gender makeup of the city was 46.9% male and 53.1% female.

2000 census
As of the census of 2000, there were 7,095 people, 2,759 households, and 1,826 families living in the city. The racial makeup of the city was 97.31% White, 0.14% African American, 0.47% Native American, 0.32% Asian, 0.58% from other races, and 1.18% from two or more races. Hispanic or Latino of any race were 2.14% of the population.

There were 2,759 households, out of which 35.9% had children under the age of 18 living with them, 49.9% were married couples living together, 12.5% had a female householder with no husband present, and 33.8% were non-families. 28.9% of all households were made up of individuals, and 13.7% had someone living alone who was 65 years of age or older.  The average household size was 2.50 and the average family size was 3.08.

In the city, the population was spread out, with 27.7% under the age of 18, 9.1% from 18 to 24, 29.2% from 25 to 44, 18.6% from 45 to 64, and 15.3% who were 65 years of age or older.  The median age was 34 years. For every 100 females, there were 88.2 males.  For every 100 females age 18 and over, there were 83.1 males.

The median income for a household in the city was $39,033, and the median income for a family was $44,886. Males had a median income of $35,226 versus $24,727 for females. The per capita income for the city was $18,042.  About 5.9% of families and 8.1% of the population were below the poverty line, including 8.3% of those under age 18 and 5.8% of those age 65 or over.

Arts and culture
Each April, Hastings hosts a three-day jazz festival.

Hastings Live provides three months of concerts and children's programming each summer.

The Hastings Performing Arts Center opened in 2019 and hosts concerts and programming year round.

The annual Barry-Roubaix cycling in Hastings was founded in 2013.

Education

Hastings School District
 Hastings High School
 Hastings Middle School
 Central Elementary
 Southeastern Elementary
 Northeastern Elementary
 Star Elementary
 Barry County Special Education

Private Schools
 St. Rose Of Lima is a Catholic elementary school offering grades K-6 as well as a licensed preschool program. 
 Barry County Christian School

Community College
Kellogg Community College (with its main campus in Battle Creek, Michigan) maintains a regional campus at the Fehsenfeld Center in Hastings since 1996.

Infrastructure

Major highways

Public library
A new Hastings Public Library opened on June 7, 2007.

Notable people
Lady Baldwin, MLB baseball player in 1800s
Gordon Johncock, Two time winner of the Indianapolis 500
Dave Joppie, MLB player and coach
John C. Ketcham, congressman
Loyal Edwin Knappen, judge of United States District Court for the Western District of Michigan
Charles Rufus Morey, art historian
Fred Rehor, pre-NFL professional football player for the Massillon Tigers
Bruce Rendon, politician
Albert Leroy Rule, documentary film producer

References

External links
City of Hastings
Early history of Hastings City 

 
Cities in Barry County, Michigan
County seats in Michigan
Grand Rapids metropolitan area
Populated places established in 1836
1836 establishments in Michigan Territory